Luciano Ernesto Silva Mora (born 3 January 1971) is a Chilean school teacher who was elected as a member of the Chilean Constitutional Convention.

References

External links
 BCN Profile

Living people
1971 births
21st-century Chilean politicians
National Renewal (Chile) politicians
Members of the Chilean Constitutional Convention
University of Playa Ancha alumni
University for Development alumni
Catholic University of the Maule alumni